Great Exhibition Bay is a  wide embayment close to the northernmost tip of New Zealand's North Island. It lies on the east coast of the Aupouri Peninsula in the Northland Region. The large natural inlet of Parengarenga Harbour lies at the northern end of the bay.

The bay was called Sandy Bay by Captain James Cook, but was renamed in commemoration of the 1851 Great Exhibition, though the reasons for this renaming are not clear. The Māori name for the bay, Tokerau, simply means "north".

References

Far North District
Bays of the Northland Region